Anaptilora is a moth genus. It is here placed in subfamily Autostichinae of family Autostichidae, though some authors assign it elsewhere in the Gelechioidea.

All species of this genus are found in Australia.

Species
Anaptilora isocosma Meyrick, 1904
Anaptilora basiphaea Turner, 1919
Anaptilora eremias Meyrick, 1904
Anaptilora homoclera Meyrick, 1916
Anaptilora haplospila Turner, 1919
Anaptilora ephelotis Meyrick, 1916
Anaptilora parasira Meyrick, 1916

Former species
Anaptilora basipercna Turner, 1933

References
Markku Savela's: www.nic.funet.fi

 
Autostichinae
Moth genera